Manfred Mayrhofer (26 September 1926 – 31 October 2011) was an Austrian Indo-Europeanist who specialized in Indo-Iranian languages. Mayrhofer served as professor emeritus at the University of Vienna. He is noted for his etymological dictionary of Sanskrit.

Mayrhofer was born in Linz and studied Indo-European and Semitic linguistics and philosophy at the University of Graz, where he received his Ph.D. in 1949. From 1953 to 1963 he taught at the University of Würzburg, and from 1963 to 1966 he was a professor at Saarland University. In 1966 he returned to Austria, serving as professor at the University of Vienna until his retirement in 1990. He died in Vienna at the age of 85.

Works
1953 – Sanskrit-Grammatik.
 English translation: A Sanskrit Grammar (2003), .
1956–80 – Kurzgefasstes etymologisches Wörterbuch des Altindischen. 4 vols. Heidelberg: Carl Winter. .
 1956 – vol. 1: A–Th
 1963 – vol. 2: D–M
 1976 – vol. 3: Y–H
 1980 – vol. 4: Index
1966 – Die Indo-Arier im alten Vorderasien. Wiesbaden:  O. Harrassowitz, 1966.
1974 – Die Arier im Vorderen Orient, ein Mythos? Mit einem bibliographischen Supplement. Vienna: Verlag der Österr. Akademie der Wissenschaften, 1974.
1977 – Die avestischen Namen, IPNB I/1 (Vienna).
1978 – Sanskrit-Grammatik mit sprachvergleichenden Erläuterungen (1978), .
1979 – Die altiranischen Namen (Vienna), .
1979/1996 – Ausgewählte kleine Schriften, .
1981 – Nach hundert Jahren. Ferdinand de Saussures Frühwerk und seine Rezeption durch die heutige Indogermanistik. Heidelberg: Carl Winter.
1982 – Sanskrit und die Sprachen Alteuropas (Göttingen)
1982 – “Welches Material aus dem Indo-arischen von Mitanni verbleibt für eine selektive Darstellung?”, in Investigationes philologicae et comparativae: Gedenkschrift für Heinz Kronasser, ed. E. Neu. Wiesbaden: O. Harrassowitz, 1982, pp. 72–90.
1986 – Indogermanische Grammatik, vol. 1: Lautlehre. Heidelberg: Carl Winter. (with Jerzy Kuryłowicz and Calvert Watkins), 
1992–2001 – Etymologisches Wörterbuch des Altindoarischen. 3 vols. Heidelberg: Carl Winter. .
 1992 – vol. 1
 1998 – vol. 2
 2001 – vol. 3
2004 – Die Hauptprobleme der indogermanischen Lautlehre seit Bechtel (Vienna), 
2005 – Die Fortsetzung der indogermanischen Laryngale im Indo-Iranischen (Vienna), 
2006 – Einiges zu den Skythen, ihrer Sprache, ihrem Nachleben (Vienna), 
2009 – Indogermanistik: Über Darstellungen und Einführungen von den Anfängen bis zur Gegenwart (Vienna),

Decorations and awards
 1982: Culture Prize of the Province of Upper Austria
 1986: Austrian Decoration for Science and Art
 1988: Wilhelm Hartel Prize
 1992: Elected to the American Philosophical Society
 1993: Elected to the American Academy of Arts and Sciences
 2004: Cardinal Innitzer Prize

References

External links
Personal webpage
https://web.archive.org/web/20050827004929/http://www.oeaw.ac.at/oeaw_servlet/PersonenDetailsGeneric?id=11138

2011 deaths
1926 births
Writers from Linz
University of Graz alumni
Academic staff of the University of Würzburg
Academic staff of Saarland University
Academic staff of the University of Vienna
Sanskrit grammarians
Austrian Indologists
Sanskrit scholars
Indo-Europeanists
Linguists of Indo-European languages
Iranologists
Linguists from Austria
Etymologists
Corresponding Fellows of the British Academy
Members of the Austrian Academy of Sciences
Foreign Members of the USSR Academy of Sciences
Foreign Members of the Russian Academy of Sciences
Recipients of the Austrian Decoration for Science and Art

Members of the American Philosophical Society